"I, Darrin, Take This Witch, Samantha" (also known simply as "I, Darrin") is the pilot episode of American television series Bewitched. The episode was produced three weeks after starring actress Elizabeth Montgomery gave birth to her first child with her husband, series director William Asher. The episode was written by Sol Saks, the creator of the series, and initially aired on September 17, 1964. José Ferrer served as the episode's narrator, starting with the words, "Once upon a time...". Ferrer was not credited for this role. In the episode, Samantha Stephens promises her new husband Darrin that she will not use magic, a promise that initiates a pattern that continues into each subsequent episode of the series; the conflict in each episode surrounds Samantha's failed attempts to keep her promise.

The pilot is one of many episodes in the series that demonstrate that Samantha and Darrin have sexual desire for each other; as opposed to being depicted as sleeping in separate beds - as Rob and Laura Petrie are depicted as doing in the concurrently running The Dick Van Dyke Show - Samantha and Darrin are depicted sleeping in the same bed and expressing eagerness to do so. Julie D. O'Reilly writes in her book Bewitched Again: Supernaturally Powerful Women on Television, 1996-2011 that, in "I, Darrin" when Darrin says, "You're a what?" in response to Samantha's statement that she is a witch, this exchange initiated a narrative that would be regularly repeated in television series into the 21st century. O'Reilly argues that this narrative is one in which a sexualized female character demonstrates to a male character that she has superpowers and the male responds with incredulity and no longer thinks of her as a woman but instead as a freak. In "I, Darrin", Nancy Kovack portrayed Darrin's ex-girlfriend Sheila Sommers, and the episode's popularity resulted in Kovack returning to make Sheila a recurring character in the series.

References

Bibliography

Bewitched
1964 American television episodes
American television series premieres